Hybrid (Scott Washington) is a fictional anti-hero appearing in American comic books published by Marvel Comics. Scott Washington first appeared in The New Warriors #21 (March 1992) by writer Fabian Nicieza and penciller Mark Bagley. The Hybrid symbiote first appeared in Venom: Along Came a Spider #1 (Jan. 1996) by writer Evan Skolnick and penciller Patrick Zircher.

Publication history
Created by writer Fabian Nicieza and penciller Mark Bagley, Scott Washington appears in The New Warriors #21 (March 1992), #25-26 and #36. In 1996, he is the main character Hybrid in the back-up stories in two miniseries Venom: Along Came a Spider and  Venom: The Hunted, all written by Evan Skolnick.

In 2007, he is mentioned in Civil War: Battle Damage Report #1. Hybrid is also mentioned at the conclusion of the first issue of Carnage U.S.A. (2011), along with Venom, Anti-Venom, Toxin, and Scorn, as being the next option to stop Carnage's rampage in the Mid-west after the Avengers are defeated.

He has an entry in All-New Official Handbook of the Marvel Universe A to Z #5 - 'Gorgon to Jury' (2006) and an entry in The Official Handbook of the Marvel Universe A to Z HC vol. 05 - 'Guardsmen to Jackal (Warren)' (2008).

Fictional character biography

Scott Washington was an African-American Guardsman involved in guarding and transporting Justice who had been arrested and sentenced to the Vault prison for supervillains.

The Hybrid symbiote is an amalgamation of four symbiotes (Riot, Phage, Lasher and Agony) into a single symbiote entity. The fused symbiote then sought out Washington in the Vault's lab facility. While guarding the symbiotes, Scott realized that they were not evil, not a threat, and the experiments were causing the organism terrible pain, so he let it go. When his superiors discovered that Scott had released the aliens he was supposed to guard, Scott was fired. He returned to the Bedford-Stuyvesant section of Brooklyn, the gang-torn neighborhood in which he grew up. Following a basketball court scuffle with the Eazy X gang, Scott and his brother Derek were shot: Derek was killed while Scott became crippled, losing the use of his legs.

The Hybrid symbiote afterwards located and bonded with Scott, which resulted in Scott regaining the ability to walk, and more since Scott has a lot of anger, so often the symbiotes hold him back from acts of violence, not the other way around. Since the Hybrid symbiote was originally four different entities, Scott has to contend with four different voices/personalities in his head besides his own. As Hybrid, Scott got revenge on the Eazy Xs gang that had crippled him. Hybrid began to get a lot of press attention. While most of Hybrid's publicity was positive, The Jury's attention got drawn anyway. Despite Scott and Curtis Elkins (Sentry) being former co-workers, Hybrid would've been executed by these self-appointed guardians of justice just for being a symbiote host but was rescued by the New Warriors. Justice offered membership in the group but Scott declined, citing more important work to do in his home neighborhood.

Scott Washington was considered as a "potential recruit" for the Initiative program.

Scott is hunted down and murdered by Eddie Brock as part of a goal to eliminate the symbiotes' "evil" from Earth. The Hybrid symbiote is later separated into the four symbiotes by a clandestine military group to be used by the U.S. Government.

Powers and abilities
Like Spider-Man and the Venom symbiote, Hybrid has wall-crawling and web-slinging abilities, and can form pseudopodia or tendrils to create snares and bladed weapons. Hybrid also has the ability to camouflage, such as its ability to mimic clothes on the person it has bonded with. It also has a border-line warning sense and can "see" through symbiote itself. Hybrid can also detach a piece of itself to send messages to allies, and can change shape to form a membrane that allows it to glide through the air. The Hybrid symbiote can also absorb various materials and chemicals, such as Spider-Man's synthetic webbing.

Like the Venom and Carnage symbiotes, the Hybrid symbiote has superhuman strength and speed. With Scott Washington as its host, he regained his ability to walk which he had lost during a gang fight. After Washington's death and being forcibly separated, the symbiotes became catatonic and no longer retain sentience.

In other media
Hybrid (Scott Washington) appears initially as a boss and later as an unlockable character in the Facebook game Marvel: Avengers Alliance.

References

External links
 
 
 Phage at Marvel Database 
 Lasher at Marvel Database 
 Riot at Marvel Database 
 Agony at Marvel Database

African-American superheroes
Characters created by Fabian Nicieza
Characters created by Mark Bagley
Comics characters introduced in 1992
Comics characters introduced in 1996
Fictional characters from New York (state)
Fictional hybrid life forms
Fictional New York City Police Department officers
Fictional parasites and parasitoids
Fictional prison officers and governors
Marvel Comics aliens
Marvel Comics characters who are shapeshifters
Marvel Comics characters who can move at superhuman speeds
Marvel Comics characters with superhuman strength
Marvel Comics male superheroes
Marvel Comics superheroes
Merged fictional characters